Too Close for Comfort is a Canadian docudrama short film, directed by Peg Campbell and released in 1990. Created as an educational film about HIV/AIDS, the film explores the effects on a group of high school students when one of them is involuntarily outed as HIV-positive.

The film stars Stephen Fanning as Nick, a high school basketball player who is fired from his after-school job at a video store when his boss is informed of his HIV status. As the information spreads, some of Nick's friends immediately reject him because they incorrectly assume that he is gay; however, some of his other friends rally around him and start to work on an educational video about HIV and homophobia, inserting the film's educational component as they interview real people living with HIV about the disease. The film also simultaneously follows the progression of David (Peter Stebbings) from being the person who first tipped off their friends about what happened at the video store, through joining the filmmaking project, to revealing that he has himself been struggling with internalized homophobia around his own sexuality.

The film premiered at the Pacific Cinémathèque on December 1, 1990. It was subsequently distributed for use in schools, along with a study guide on HIV and anti-homophobia education. An extended version of the film's documentary component was also separately released in 1991 under the title Eric's Video.

The film won the TVOntario Prize for Best Youth Documentary at the 1992 Banff Television Festival.

References

1990 films
Canadian docudrama films
Canadian LGBT-related short films
LGBT-related drama films
1990 LGBT-related films
Documentary films about HIV/AIDS
1990s English-language films
Canadian drama short films
HIV/AIDS in Canadian films
1990s Canadian films
Canadian educational films